Sternberg is a town in the Ludwigslust-Parchim district of the state of Mecklenburg-Vorpommern.

History

The town of Sternberg was founded during the Ostsiedlung by duke Pribislaw I, who chartered the town with German town law in 1248. In the vicinity of the town are the remains of three earlier, Slavic settlements (near Groß Raden and Sternberger Burg within the current city limits, and near Groß Görnow). The Slavic settlement and ramparts near Groß Raden have been excavated and reconstructed and serve as a well-known open-air museum for the Slavic era.

Suzerainty over Sternberg was transferred from Pribislaw to the Prince of Mecklenburg following Pribislaw's expulsion in 1255. Sternberg became the favorite residence of duke Heinrich II. (the Lion) in 1310.  In 1492, 27 Jews were burned on the Judenberg after being charged with Eucharistic Sacrilege, a fictitious crime used in Jewish pogroms throughout medieval and renaissance Europe.  On June 20, 1549, the Reformation was introduced in Mecklenburg as a result of a special council (Landtag) on the Sagsdorfer Bridge in Sternberg.  In 1628, during the Thirty Years' War Albrecht von Wallenstein held council here.

Geography
The city is located southwest of Rostock, southeast of Wismar, and northeast of Schwerin. It is located near the Warnow River.

People 
 Albrecht Tischbein (1803-1881), German shipbuilder
 Alexander Behm (1880-1952), German inventor and physicist

References

External links
  Official Sternberg Website

Cities and towns in Mecklenburg
Ludwigslust-Parchim
Populated places established in the 13th century
1240s establishments in the Holy Roman Empire
1248 establishments in Europe
Grand Duchy of Mecklenburg-Schwerin